Donald Henry Bradshaw (May 11, 1932 – May 17, 2003) public figure and businessman, who served as mayor of Brisbane, California in the 1970s and 1980s  as well as president of the Brisbane Chamber of Commerce

References

1932 births
2003 deaths
Mayors of places in California
20th-century American politicians